Franklin County Airport  is a public airport located one mile (2 km) east of the central business district of Sewanee, a census-designated place in Franklin County, Tennessee, United States. It is owned by Franklin County.

It is a general aviation airport located atop the Cumberland Plateau. The location is commonly referred to as Monteagle Mountain since it is near one of the most notoriously hazardous stretches of Interstate highway in the United States where Interstate 24 crosses the plateau. The ICAO designation "KUOS" resulted from its proximity to the University of the South. Although the airport is named "Franklin County", it is referred to as "Sewanee" over the radio on Unicom 122.8.

History 
Franklin County was the home airport of late aviation legend Bill Kershner. He was one of the world's leading experts on spins and spin recovery and was known as the Spin Doctor in the aviation community.

The airport was designed by architect Edwin A. Keeble.

Facilities and aircraft 
For the 12-month period ending November 29, 1999, the airport had 3,500 aircraft operations, 100% of which were general aviation.

References

External links 
 

Airports in Tennessee
Buildings and structures in Franklin County, Tennessee
Transportation in Franklin County, Tennessee